The Mellah of Marrakesh, formerly known as Hay Essalam is the Jewish Quarter (Mellah) of the city of Marrakesh, Morocco. It is the second oldest of its kind in the country.

History
Although the city of Marrakesh was founded by the Almoravids in 1060, Jews settled 40 km away and there is no recorded Jewish presence in the city until 1232. After the Reconquista and expulsion of Jews from the Iberian Peninsula in 1492, Jews started to arrive in great numbers to Morocco, settling mostly in cities and mixing with the local Jewish population. Many mellahs were created to protect the Jews under their dhimmi status. The Mellah of Marrakesh was created by decree of the Sultan Abdallah al-Ghalib of the Saadian dynasty in 1558, outside of the walls of El Badi Palace. During the 16th and 17th centuries, the Mellah was one of the main commercial areas of the city, and it was a walled quarter, with its gates closed at night.

Decline
The mellah became overpopulated within few years, with most estimates that more than 40,000 people living in the mellah at the peak of its population in the late 1940s, before the emigration of the community after the independence of Israel, the end of the French protectorate, and the Six-Day and Yom Kippur wars to Israel mainly, and also to France and Montreal. The Jewish population of the mellah of Marrakesh today is about 200 inhabitants.

Restoration
In 2016, King Mohamed VI ordered to restore the names of the streets that had to do with the city's Jewish heritage, including restoring the name of the neighborhood back to "El Mellah", allocating over US$20 million for the restoration of houses, streets and synagogues. In November of the same year, Zouheir Bahloul, an Arab member of the Knesset for the party Zionist Union requested funds from the Israeli government to support a synagogue located in the mellah, in an unexpected move for both the Israeli government and the Jewish Community of Morocco. Today, the mellah is one of the main tourist attractions of the city.

See also
Slat Al Azama Synagogue
Jewish Cemetery Miâara
History of the Jews in Morocco

References

External links 
Marrakesh. Jewish Virtual Library
THE MELLAH OF MARRAKECH. Morocco.com
Marrakech’s historic Jewish heart. The West Australian

Marrakesh
Jewish ghettos
Jews and Judaism in Morocco